WCVP (600 AM) is a radio station broadcasting a country music format.  Licensed to Murphy, North Carolina, United States, the station is currently owned by Cherokee Broadcasting Company and features programming from AP Radio and Jones Radio Network.

The station is an affiliate of the Atlanta Braves radio network, the largest radio affiliate network in Major League Baseball. WCVP is also an affiliate of the Motor Racing Network and the Performance Racing Network, airing NASCAR racing.

References

External links

CVP